Sat Prakash Bansal is an Indian Professor who is currently the Vice-Chancellor of Central University of Himachal Pradesh with an additional charge of Vice-Chancellor of Himachal Pradesh University.

He was formerly also the Vice-Chancellor of Himachal Pradesh Technical University, Indira Gandhi University, Haryana, Bhagat Phool Singh Women's University and Maharaja Agrasen University.

References

Living people
Academic staff of Indira Gandhi University, Rewari
Place of birth missing (living people)
1965 births